The Otter Creek Wilderness is a U.S. Wilderness area located in the Cheat-Potomac Ranger District of Monongahela National Forest in West Virginia, USA. The Wilderness sits in a bowl-shaped valley formed by Otter Creek, between McGowan Mountain and Shavers Mountain in Tucker and Randolph Counties.

History
By 1914, almost all of the virgin forest in the Otter Creek watershed had been timbered, mostly by the Otter Creek Boom and Lumber Company, but also by the owners of several small farms and homesteads.  In 1917 key land purchases were made by the U.S. Forest Service as part of the formation of the national forest system.  The Otter Creek area was managed as a multiple use forest, including some second growth logging, until the passage of the Eastern Wilderness Act in 1975. The last private in-holding was acquired the same year.

2009 addition
The Omnibus Public Lands Management Act of 2009 added  to the original  of the Otter Creek Wilderness. This addition is situated on the northern and eastern flanks of McGowan Mountain leading down to Dry Fork. It provides much of the scenic view for this popular river which contains excellent whitewater paddling and trout fishing.

Ecology

The Shavers Mountain Spruce-Hemlock Stand, a  red spruce-hemlock stand of old growth forest, is partly within the Otter Creek Wilderness.

References

Further reading
Otter Creek Wilderness at American Byways

IUCN Category Ib
Monongahela National Forest
Protected areas of Randolph County, West Virginia
Protected areas of Tucker County, West Virginia
Wilderness areas of West Virginia